Luis Eduardo Pérez (1774 – August 30, 1841) was the first interim president of Uruguay.

President of the Senate
Pérez was President of the Senate of Uruguay 1830-1833 and 1840, and it was in that capacity that he acted as interim Head of State in 1830.

First interim President of Uruguay in 1830
He was President of Uruguay as an interim measure from October 24, 1830 to November 6 of the same year.

Death
He died in 1841.

References

See also
 History of Uruguay

1774 births
1841 deaths
People from Montevideo
Presidents of Uruguay
Presidents of the Senate of Uruguay
Uruguayan people of Spanish descent
Defence ministers of Uruguay